Jose Manuel Heredia Jr. (born 1954) is a Belizean politician. He is the Minister of Tourism and from 2008-2012 held the Civil Aviation portfolio in Belize. After the 2012 General Election, and the reshuffle of cabinet, he was given the Culture portfolio which made him the Minister of Tourism and Culture until 2020 when he was defeated in his seat by Andre Perez of the People's United Party (PUP)

References

1954 births
Living people
United Democratic Party (Belize) politicians
Government ministers of Belize
Members of the Belize House of Representatives  for Belize Rural South